The Universidad Intercontinental (commonly known as UIC; in English: Intercontinental University) is a private Catholic University, located in Mexico City. Founded in 1976 by Guadalupe Missionaries and being one of the only six Mexican universities in the International Federation of Catholic Universities (IFCU).

With historical strengths in dentistry, Psychology, and Pedagogy, it is one of the top Mexican universities in these fields.

World leaders in the area of communications such as Rodrigo Flores López, Alfonso de Anda and Adriana Sodi majored from Universidad Intercontinental.

See also
List of universities in Mexico

References

External links

Official site
Online Education Official site
Wild Swans' Official Site
Universidad Intercontinental Overview
Directory of Canadian Universities’ programs database
International Federation of Catholic Universities in Mexico

es:Universidad Intercontinental

Universities in Mexico City
Private universities and colleges in Mexico
Catholic universities and colleges in Mexico
Educational institutions established in 1976
1976 establishments in Mexico